Greenbriar is an unincorporated community and census-designated place (CDP) in Pinellas County, Florida, United States. The population was 2,502 at the 2010 census.

Geography
Greenbriar is located at  (28.0113, -82.7527). It is bordered by the city of Dunedin to the north and west, the city of Clearwater to the east, and by unincorporated Pinellas County land to the south.

Demographics

References

Unincorporated communities in Pinellas County, Florida
Census-designated places in Pinellas County, Florida
Census-designated places in Florida
Unincorporated communities in Florida